1942: A Love Story, also known as 1942 A Love Story, is a 1994 Indian Hindi-language patriotic romance film, directed by Vidhu Vinod Chopra. It stars Anil Kapoor, Manisha Koirala and Jackie Shroff, with Anupam Kher, Danny Denzongpa, Pran and Brian Glover. The film revolves around two lovers—Naren (Kapoor) and Rajjo (Koirala), who come from contrasting family backgrounds and shows how their relationship is threatened owing to the outbreak of the Indian revolutionary movement.

The film's core plot was reported to be inspired by the Kannada-language film Mysore Mallige  which itself was based on the 1942 work of same title by K. S. Narasimhaswamy. The screenplay was jointly written by Sanjay Leela Bhansali, Kamna Chandra and Chopra. Binod Pradhan acted as the cinematographer while Renu Saluja edited the film. R. D. Burman composed the highly successful soundtrack with lyrics penned by Javed Akhtar. This was the last film work of R. D. Burman, who died before the release of the film. It was the first Indian film on Dolby Stereo.

Plot 
The film is set in 1942, when the British Raj was declining from power. It was a time when many Indian citizens were either working for the British regime or rallying in underground meetings and protests against them. In this atmosphere, Narendra Singh (Anil Kapoor) falls in love with Rajeshwari Pathak (Manisha Koirala). Their romance is shown developing in spite of the political and social unrest at the time.

Narendra's father Diwan Hari Pratap Singh (Manohar Singh) is a loyal British employee working for the brutal British General Douglas (Brian Glover), who is infamous in tracking down and executing citizens who are believed to be revolutionaries. Rajeshwari's father Raghuveer Pathak (Anupam Kher) is a revolutionary fighting against British rule, as he holds a grudge against Douglas for murdering his son. When Narendra asks Raghuveer for Rajeshwari's hand in marriage, Raghuveer becomes livid by this. However, Narendra declares that he is willing to sacrifice everything for Rajeshwari and convinces Raghuveer of his love for her. Raghuveer relents, but tells Narendra to talk to his father first. When Narendra does so, Hari is angry that his son has chosen the daughter of a revolutionary, but pretends that he will do anything for Narendra's happiness.

However, Hari tricks Narendra into revealing Raghuveer's secret location and leaks the information to Major Bisht (Danny Dengzongpa) and the British authorities. Soon, police barge into Raghuveer's hideaway and try to kill him, only to find him waiting to light a bomb, killing both himself and the men. Rajeshwari, who was out at that time, realises what has happened and runs away. She is taken into refuge by Shubhankar (Jackie Shroff), a compatriot of Raghuveer who has learned of his death. Under Shubhankar's tutelage, Rajeshwari follows her father's revolutionary path. Meanwhile, Narendra get furious at his father for using him in killing Raghuveer and driving Rajeshwari away. Promising to make up to Rajeshwari and help her cause, Narendra pledges to become a revolutionary by severing all ties with his father; even Bisht's daughter Chanda (Chandni) does the same after witnessing Bisht murdering her teacher Abid Ali Baig (Pran), who is a revolutionary allied with Shubhankar, much to Bisht's remorse.

To prove more his point, Narendra attempts to murder Douglas in front of the city, but is caught in the act after shooting down a few soldiers. Narendra is then convicted and sentenced to hang for attempted murder. Douglas then orders his troops to fire at the town square, resulting several deaths of citizens, including Chanda. However, Shubhankar saves Narendra from being hanged and Bisht develops a change of heart after witnessing Chanda's death, helping Shubhankar and Narendra in finishing off Hari and the remaining loyalists and stabbing Douglas with a flagpole. With the loyalists dead, Narendra reconciles with Rajeshwari while Shubhankar hangs Douglas to death, avenging all those who perished under Douglas' wrath. The film ends with Narendra, Rajeshwari, Shubhankar, Bisht and the surviving citizens hoisting and saluting the Indian flag.

Cast 
 Anil Kapoor as Narendra Singh "Naren"
Jackie Shroff as Shubhankar 
Manisha Koirala as Rajeshwari Pathak "Rajjo"
 Chandni as Chanda Bisht
 Anupam Kher as Raghuveer Pathak
 Danny Denzongpa as Major Bisht
 Pran as Abid Ali Baig
 Ashish Vidyarthi as Ashutosh
 Raghuveer Yadav as Munna
 Sushma Seth as Gayatri Singh
 Manohar Singh as Diwan Hari Pratap Singh
 Brian Glover as General Douglas

Production

Development 

Kamna Chandra, one of the script writers of the film, had gone to the United States to meet her daughters Tanuja and Anupama (whom Vidhu Vinod Chopra would later marry) as they were studying there. Having watched Chopra's film Parinda on video and being impressed with it, both of them asked their mother to write a story and approach him to direct it. Chandra had previously written Prem Rog and Chandni; both were love stories. She knew Chopra made "dark films", but decided to meet him.

After returning, Chandra met Chopra at Natraj Studios. She made him listen to two or three of her ideas, among which he liked one and asked her to develop it. Chandra finished the script and dialogues by a year, until a day when Chopra himself called her and suggested that they should make a love story set in another era instead of the present time. This provoked Chandra; she could not sleep that night. However, she became excited in the next few days. She had grown up amidst the Indian freedom struggle, so she decided to place the story at that time. This formed the core plot for 1942: A Love Story.

Casting
Aamir Khan had initially been offered the role of Narendra; but he declined. Anil Kapoor was then approached, who was hesitant to do the film and suggested Bobby Deol and Aamir Khan for the role. However, he was later convinced. To prepare himself for the role, Kapoor worked hard — he lost weight, cut short his hair, trimmed his moustache and worked on his costumes to create the character. Shah Rukh Khan was under consideration for the role later done by Raghuvir Yadav; he did not feature as he had already been playing lead roles. Jackie Shroff was cast as Shubankar. He gave financial assistance to the film. For instance, some (extra) houses built at the film's set (which were first disapproved of by Vidhu Vinod Chopra due to the limited budget) were paid for by Shroff. Moreover, he also paid composer R. D. Burman on behalf of Chopra when he made them listen the music of the film for the very first time.

Chopra had crafted the role of Rajeshwari Pathak alias Rajjo in accordance to Madhuri Dixit; lyricist Javed Akhtar had also kept her in mind while penning the lyrics for "Ek Ladki Ko Dekha To". By the time the film was launched, Dixit had packed schedules, which meant she couldn't do the film. Manisha Koirala, who had given an audition for the role of Rajjo's sister (the role was later excluded from the film), was then asked by Chopra to give a screen test. But, after seeing Koirala enacting a scene, Chopra deemed her a "terrible actress". Koirala, however, asked him for a second chance. She went back home, practised her lines and came back prepared the next day. She pleased Chopra with her performance and was thereafter signed. Ashwini Bhave was also one of those who had auditioned for the role. She was rejected on the spot.

Nana Patekar, who had previously worked with Chopra in Parinda (1989), was selected to portray Raghuvir Pathak. But he insisted on being cast as Shubankar, which caused a rift between him and Chopra. Anupam Kher was later signed for the role. Mithun Chakraborty had also been briefly considered for the role of Shubankar, when Shroff developed date issues. The distributors, however, somehow made Chopra retain Shroff in the film. Since the production started in the early 90s, it was speculated that Sanjay Kapoor was to replace his brother Anil as the latter's film Lamhe (1991) had not been successful. Nevertheless, it did not materialize.

Filming
Principal photography for the film, being handled by Binod Pradhan, took place mainly at various locations in Himachal Pradesh, including the district Chamba, Dalhousie, Khajjiar and the Kalatop Sanctuary to depict pre-independence India. An artificial set resembling Dalhousie was created in the Mumbai Filmcity, since it was an expensive proposition to take the entire cast and crew there. According to Desai, many people told Chopra not to give chance to him, as he was a newcomer; yet Chopra had full faith on him.

Music 
The film score was composed by Manohari Singh and Babloo Chakravorty while the film's original songs were composed by R. D. Burman, who died before the release of the film, with lyrics by Javed Akhtar. R. D. Burman won his last Filmfare Award for Best Music Director and Javed Akthar bagged the Filmfare Award for Best Lyricist for "Ek Ladki Ko Dekha To". Kumar Sanu won his 5th consecutive Filmfare Award for Best Male Playback Singer for "Ek Ladki Ko Dekha To" and Kavita Krishnamurthy won the Filmfare Award for Best Female Playback Singer for "Pyar Hua Chupke Se", the first of her hat-trick feat. The music in the introduction of the film is from Gustav Holst's The Planets - Mars the bringer of war.

Release 
1942: A Love Story was released on 15 April 1994. It opened to positive reviews from critics, with praise drawn towards the cast performances, cinematography, and the soundtrack by R. D. Burman. Amitabh Bachchan had attended the preview screening of the film and congratulated Chopra for his endeavour.

Accolades

Notes

References

External links 

Films directed by Vidhu Vinod Chopra
Films scored by R. D. Burman
1990s romance films
Films set in 1942
Films set in the Indian independence movement
1990s Hindi-language films
Hindi-language romance films
Indian romance films